India participated in the 1974 Asian Games held in Tehran, Iran from 1 to 16 September 1974. Athletes from India won overall 28 medals, including four gold, and finished seventh in a medal table.

Medals by sport

References

Nations at the 1974 Asian Games
1974
Asian Games